Ian David McShane (born 29 September 1942) is an English actor, producer and director. He is known for his television performances, particularly as the title role in the BBC series Lovejoy (1986–1994), Al Swearengen in Deadwood (2004–2006) and its 2019 film continuation, as well as Mr. Wednesday in American Gods (2017–2021). For the original series of Deadwood, McShane won the Golden Globe Award for Best Actor – Television Series Drama and received a nomination for the Primetime Emmy Award for Outstanding Lead Actor in a Drama Series; for the film, he (as producer) was nominated for the Primetime Emmy Award for Outstanding Television Movie.

His film roles include Harry Brown in The Wild and the Willing (1962), Charlie Cartwright in If It's Tuesday, This Must Be Belgium (1969), Wolfe Lissner in Villain (1971), Teddy Bass in Sexy Beast (2000), Frank Powell in Hot Rod (2007), Captain Hook in Shrek the Third (2007), Tai Lung in Kung Fu Panda (2008), Blackbeard in Pirates of the Caribbean: On Stranger Tides (2011) and Winston Scott in the John Wick film series (2014–present).

Early life

McShane was born Ian David McShane in Blackburn, Lancashire, on 29 September 1942, the only child of Irene (née Cowley; 1922–2020) and professional footballer Harry McShane (1920–2012). His father was Scottish, from Holytown, Lanarkshire, and his mother, who was born in England, was of Irish and English descent. McShane grew up in Davyhulme, Lancashire, and attended Stretford Grammar School. After being a member of the National Youth Theatre, he studied at the Royal Academy of Dramatic Art (RADA), alongside Anthony Hopkins and John Hurt. McShane shared a flat with Hurt, whom he called his "oldest friend in the business", and was still a student at RADA when he appeared (along with Hurt) in his first film The Wild and the Willing (1962). He went on to play Satan in the York Mystery Plays in 1963.

Career
In the United Kingdom, McShane's best known role is antiques dealer Lovejoy in the eponymous series. Long before Lovejoy, McShane was a pin-up as a result of appearances in television series, such as Wuthering Heights (1967, as Heathcliff), Jesus of Nazareth (1977, as Judas Iscariot), and Disraeli (1978)—as well as films like Sky West and Crooked (1965) and Battle of Britain (1969). The actor also enjoyed success in the United States as British film director Don Lockwood in Dallas.

In the United States, he is known for the role of historical figure Al Swearengen in the HBO series Deadwood, for which he won the 2005 Golden Globe Award for Best Actor in a Television Drama. He was also nominated at the 2005 Emmy Award and Screen Actors Guild Awards.

Among science fiction fans, McShane is known for playing the character Robert Bryson in Babylon 5: The River of Souls. In a 2004 interview with The Independent, McShane stated that he wished that he had turned down the role of Bryson as he had struggled with the technical dialogue and found looking at Martin Sheen, who was wearing an eye in the middle of his forehead, to be the most embarrassing experience that he had ever had while acting.

In 1985, he appeared as an MC on Grace Jones' Slave to the Rhythm, a concept album which featured his narration interspersed throughout and which sold over a million copies worldwide.

His other roles include that of armed robber and gangland boss Jack Last in the Minder episode The Last Video Show. As Captain Hook in Shrek the Third, Ragnar Sturlusson in The Golden Compass, Tai Lung in Kung Fu Panda (for which he received an Annie Award nomination), crime boss Teddy Bass in Sexy Beast, and Mr. Bobinsky in Coraline. In live-action, he has performed in Hot Rod, the action/thriller Death Race, and The Seeker. He has appeared in The West Wing as a Russian diplomat. During 2007–08, he starred as Max in the 40th anniversary Broadway revival of Harold Pinter's The Homecoming, co-starring Eve Best, Raúl Esparza, and Michael McKean, and directed by Daniel Sullivan, at the Cort Theatre (16 December 2007 – 13 April 2008).

In 2009, he appeared in Kings, which was based on the biblical story of David. His portrayal of King Silas Benjamin, an analogue of King Saul, was highly praised with one critic saying: "Whenever Kings seems to falter, McShane appears to put bite marks all over the scenery."

In 2010, McShane starred in The Pillars of the Earth as Bishop Waleran Bigod. The series was a historical drama set in 12th-century England and adapted from Ken Follett's novel of the same name. That same year, the Walt Disney Company confirmed that McShane would portray Blackbeard in On Stranger Tides.

In 2013, he played King Brahmwell in Bryan Singer's Jack the Giant Slayer.

Since 2010, McShane has narrated the opening teases for each round of ESPN's coverage of The Open Championship. In 2012, McShane had a guest role for two episodes as Murder Santa, a sadistic serial killer in the 1960s in the second season of American Horror Story. In 2016, he joined the cast of Game of Thrones in Season 6 as Ray.

McShane announced on 20 April 2017 that a script for a two-hour Deadwood film had been submitted by creator David Milch to HBO and that a film was as close as ever to happening. "[A] two-hour movie script has been delivered to HBO. If they don't deliver [a finished product], blame them," McShane said. The film began production in October 2018. Deadwood: The Movie was released on 31 May 2019, concluding the story of the series.

Personal life
McShane married and divorced Suzan Farmer in the 1960s. Then he married model Ruth Post with whom he had two children, Kate and Morgan. In 1977, he began a relationship with Sylvia Kristel after meeting her on the set of The Fifth Musketeer. On 30 August 1980, McShane married Gwen Humble. They live in Venice, California. Through his daughter Kate, McShane has three grandchildren.

He supports Manchester United Football Club.

Filmography

Film

Television

Video games

Awards and nominations

References

External links

 
 
 
 
 "A Conversation with Actor Ian McShane" (Max)—The Charlie Rose Show, PBS, broadcast of 24 March 2008. Accessed 25 March 2008. ("A conversation with actor Ian McShane about his role in the 40th Anniversary Broadway revival of Harold Pinter's The Homecoming.")
 The Homecoming on Broadway—Official site of the 40th anniversary Broadway revival at the Cort Theatre. Accessed 25 March 2008.

1942 births
Living people
People from Blackburn
20th-century English male actors
21st-century English male actors
Alumni of RADA
Best Drama Actor Golden Globe (television) winners
English expatriates in the United States
English male film actors
English male television actors
English male voice actors
English people of Irish descent
English people of Scottish descent
Male actors from Lancashire
National Youth Theatre members
People educated at Stretford Grammar School
People from Davyhulme
Male actors from Manchester